Lower Kolašin (Montenegrin and ) is a historical region in the present-day municipality of Bijelo Polje in northern Montenegro, towards Serbia. It is situated in the picturesque Vraneš valley formed around the river Ljuboviđa. The most important local populated centers are Tomaševo and Pavino Polje.
 Historical regions in Montenegro

Geography
Lower Kolašin is a region situated in the northern part of Montenegro, at the border with Serbia. It is located between the rivers of Tara, Ljuboviđa, left tributary of Lim river and source of the Ćeotina. It is located at the left side of the Lim river, and its central part is made up of the valley of the Vraneš river. To the south lies the region of Upper Kolašin, around Mojkovac. On the other side of the Lim is the region of Bihor.

History

Middle Ages
The Ljuboviđa župa (county) was mentioned in medieval documents beginning in 1281. It was named after a river that passed through the Vraneš valley. The county included an area from the Tara in the west, beyond the Lim to the east, from Brodarevo in the north to south of Mojkovac.

19th century
According to the Treaty of San Stefano (3 March 1878), the region was to be ceded to the Principality of Montenegro, however, it was never implemented. With the Congress of Berlin (13 July 1878), the Austro-Hungarians obtained the right to station garrisons in the Sanjak of Novi Pazar. In 1880, the Sanjak of Sjenica (the new Sanjak of Novi Pazar) was established, which included the kaza (districts) of Sjenica (its seat), Nova Varoš, Bijelo Polje and Lower Kolašin (part of modern Bijelo Polje and Mojkovac municipalities).

In 1886, Lower Kolašin was ceded to Montenegro. That same year, all Muslim families emigrated to Turkey. The abandoned land was settled by rebels from this area and neighbouring ones, by Prince Nikola I Petrović-Njegoš.

20th century
In 1912, during the First Balkan War, Montenegro occupied Lower Kolašin on 12 October 1912. Shortly thereafter, the three local municipalities were formed in Lower Kolašin with centers in Tomaševo, Pavino Polje, and Stozer.

After the local Montenegrin administrator, Boško Bošković was murdered near Obod by his countrymen, the Montenegrin nationalists used that as an excuse to blame a local Muslim, Jusuf Mehonić, for the murder, which would open a way for the complete expulsion of Muslims from Lower Kolašin. On 9–10 November 1924, armed hordes of Montenegrin peasants massacred up to 600–700 Muslims in Lower Kolašin, committing the most atrocious crimes. Following this event, all surviving Muslims left Lower Kolašin, relocating to other parts of Sandžak, Bosnia and Herzegovina or Turkey. One family converted to Orthodox Christianity, saving itself from physical extermination.

Demographics
The present-day population of Lower Kolašin is 4,300, all Serbs and Montenegrins.

Prior to the massacre in 1924, according to the census in 1912, Lower Kolašin had 14,838 inhabitants, with the following ethnic distribution:

 Mojkovac municipality: Muslims 1,581, Serbs 1,293
 Ravna Rijeka municipality: Muslims 2,003, Serbs 679
 Stozer municipality: Muslims 1,160, Serbs 1,971
 Pavino Polje municipality: Muslims 3,230, Serbs 641;
 Tomaševo municipality: Muslims 2,132, Serbs 119

In percentages, the overall breakdown is:
 Muslims: 10,106 or 68.1%
 Serbs: 4,703 or 31.7%
 Others: 29 or 0.2%

Anthropology
Muslim families that left after the 1924 massacre were the Hadžović, Kaljić and Kolić, among others.

See also
Upper Kolašin
Ibarski Kolašin (North Kosovo)

References

Geography of Montenegro